Prosecutor Corda is a 1953 West German drama film directed by Karl Ritter and starring Ingeborg Engholm, Paul Klinger and Eva Probst. It was shot at the Wiesbaden Studios in Hesse and on location around the Rheingau. The film's sets were designed by the art directors Alfred Bütow and Ernst Schomer.

Synopsis
A female state prosecutor is confronted with her past when her former lover is put on trial.

Cast
 Ingeborg Egholm as Prosecutor Dr. Corda Frobenius
 Paul Klinger as Gastwirt Hans Neidhard
 Eva Probst as Steffi
 Alexander Golling as Gerichtspräsident
 Erika von Thellmann as Aenne Frobenius
 Paul Henckels as Bürgermeister
 Gisela von Collande as Klara Neidhard
 Herbert Hübner Senior Prosecutor
 Ilse Furstenberg as Grete
 Fritz Rémond as Prosecutor Kohlrausch
 Lutz Götz as Kriegsgefangenes

References

Bibliography 
 James Robert Parish. Film Actors Guide. Scarecrow Press, 1977.

External links 
 

1953 films
1953 drama films
German drama films
West German films
1950s German-language films
Films directed by Karl Ritter
Films scored by Fred Raymond
German black-and-white films
1950s German films